Nathan Ball (born February 15, 1983) is an American former professional basketball player. He played college basketball for the Charleston Southern Buccaneers.

References

External links

1983 births
Living people
American expatriate basketball people in North Macedonia
American men's basketball players
Basketball players from Greensboro, North Carolina
Charleston Southern Buccaneers men's basketball players
KK MZT Skopje players
Power forwards (basketball)